Bantala is a neighbourhood of East Kolkata in the Indian state of West Bengal.

Geography

Area overview
Baruipur subdivision is a rural subdivision with moderate levels of urbanization. 31.05% of the population lives in the urban areas and 68.95% lives in the rural areas. In the northern portion of the subdivision (shown in the map alongside) there are 10 census towns. The entire district is situated in the Ganges Delta and the northern  part of the subdivision is a flat plain bordering the metropolis of Kolkata.

Note: The map alongside presents some of the notable locations in the subdivision. All places marked in the map are linked in the larger full screen map.

Location

Civic administration

Police station
Kolkata Leather Complex police station is part of the East division of Kolkata Police. It is Located at Karaidanga, PO Bhojerhat-743502. Kolkata Leather Complex police station was created in 2017, under South Industrial police district in South 24 Parganas district and transferred to Kolkata Police in the same year. Kolkata Leather Complex police station has jurisdiction over Bhangar I and Bhangar II CD blocks.

Economy

Kolkata Leather Complex
Kolkata Leather Complex is an area that houses Kolkata's leather industry. It has the capacity of developing 1,000 tonnes of hides per day. It is the second most important tanning centre in the country, accounting for about 22-25% of the tanning in the country. Kolkata Leather Complex was set up following a Supreme Court directive to the city's tanneries, on 19 December 1996, to shift to Bantala. It was formally inaugurated on 30 July 2005.

Information Technology
Bantala IT SEZ is spread over 130 acres. CTS operates from a 20-acre campus.

Transport
Basanti Highway (part of State Highway 3) is the artery of the area. The road is connected with EM Bypass at Dhapa.

Bus

Private Bus
 213 Ghatakpukur - Babughat
 213A Ghatakpukur - Rajabazar
 213/1 Ghatakpukur - Shibpur Botanic Garden
 DN16/1 Dhamakhali - Barasat
 SD24 Sonakhali, Basanti - Alipore Zoo

CTC Bus
 C2A Ghatakpukur - Tollygunge
 T12 Chaital Ghat - Howrah Station

Bus Route Without Number
 Malancha - Kolkata Station

Train
Park Circus railway station on Sealdah South lines is the nearest railway station.

References

External links

Neighbourhoods in Kolkata
Cities and towns in South 24 Parganas district